Bakersfield Sports Village, also known as Kaiser Permanente Sports Village, is a  tournament-style sporting complex located in Bakersfield, California, located along Taft Highway between Ashe Road and Gosford Road. Phase 1 (which was completed in 2011) contains 8 soccer fields. When fully constructed, it will have 16 soccer fields, 10 baseball fields, 4 football fields, and an indoor gymnasium. There will also be a large stadium which can be configured for either soccer or football. Surrounding facilities will include a recreational park with a large lake, and two retail shopping areas.

References

External links
Bakersfield Sports Village

Sports venues in Bakersfield, California